Lise kommer til Byen is a 1947 Danish family film directed by Lau Lauritzen Jr. and Alice O'Fredericks.

Cast
Gerda Gilboe as Lise Olsen
Poul Reichhardt as Instruktør Dan 'Basse' Burling
Lau Lauritzen Jr. as Filmdirektør Hans Berg
Lisbeth Movin as Scriptgirlen Irma Hansen
Lise Thomsen as Skuespiller Nanna Johansen
Preben Mahrt as Skuespiller Karl
Henning Ahrensborg as Skolelærer Nielsen
Kjeld Petersen as Forsikringsagent Tage Sørensen
Einar Juhl as Direktør Svendsen
Marius Hansen as Krovært
Ib Schønberg as Skuespiller Kristoffer 'Steff' Steffensen
Sven Gyldmark as Himself
Mogens Dam as Himself
Poul Bundgaard as Medlem af filmholdet (uncredited)
Marie Ejlersen as Herself (uncredited)
Johan Jacobsen as Himself (uncredited)
Kjeld Jacobsen as Filmoperatør (uncredited)
Henry Nielsen as Taxachauffør (uncredited)
Ove Sprogøe as Filmoperatør (uncredited)

External links

1947 films
1947 romantic comedy films
1940s Danish-language films
Danish black-and-white films
Danish romantic comedy films
Films directed by Lau Lauritzen Jr.
Films directed by Alice O'Fredericks
Films scored by Sven Gyldmark